Amour is a cycle of five pieces for clarinet by Karlheinz Stockhausen, composed in 1974–76. The composer thought of each piece as a gift for a close friend. The cycle is given the number 44 in Stockhausen's catalogue of works.

History
The first piece of the cycle was composed in 1974 while Stockhausen was vacationing in Senegal, at Ngor, a beach resort near Dakar; the rest were composed during a week in December 1976, in Kürten, Germany, as Christmas gifts for family members and close associates.

 "Sei wieder fröhlich" ("Cheer up", 12 December 1974)
Composed for clarinetist Suzee (Suzanne) Stephens, who worked with Stockhausen on a number of projects, including Herbstmusik (1974), Harlekin (1975), In Freundschaft (1977), Traum-Formel (1981), and others. This is a short (the score indicates approximate playing time of 1'30"), melodic work.
 "Dein Engel wacht über Dir" ("Your angel is watching over you", 11 December 1976)
Composed for Mary Bauermeister, the composer's second wife. This piece was conceived by Stockhausen as a dialogue between two voices: one low and soft, the other loud, two octaves higher. The voices unite into a single entity, which is then transformed several times.
 "Die Schmetterlinge spielen" ("The butterflies are playing", 16 December 1976)
Composed for Jaynee Stephens, Suzanne's younger sister. This is a character piece in which the butterflies are represented by short, fast two-note motifs. One of the butterflies has, in the composer's words, "a beat of wide intervals in triplets", and the other's wings move in "fast duplets of small intervals".
 "Ein Vöglein singt an Deinem Fenster" ("A little bird is singing at your window", 12 December 1976)
Composed for Suzanne Stephens. This also is a character piece, which begins with a "bird" melody—fast, wide intervals, trills—which gradually transforms into a calmer, unadorned "human" melody.
 "Vier Sterne weisen Dir den Weg" ("Four stars show you the way", 13 December 1976)
Composed for Doris Stockhausen-Andreae, the composer's first wife. The title refers to the four children Doris and Karlheinz had: Suja, Christel, Markus, and Majella. There are, accordingly, four related, four-note formulas in the piece, which are gradually transformed in various ways.

Amour was first performed publicly on 9 January 1978, in Stuttgart, by Suzanne Stephens. In 1981 Stockhausen created a flute version of the cycle, which was followed by a cello arrangement of "Vier Sterne weisen Dir den Weg" in 1998, and a saxophone version of the entire cycle, created in 2003.

References

Sources

Further reading
 Frisius, Rudolf. 1996. Karlheinz Stockhausen I: Einführung in das Gesamtwerk; Gespräche mit Karlheinz Stockhausen. Mainz: Schott Musik International. .
 Frisius, Rudolf. 2008. Karlheinz Stockhausen II: Die Werke 1950–1977; Gespräch mit Karlheinz Stockhausen, "Es geht aufwärts". Mainz, London, Berlin, Madrid, New York, Paris, Prague, Tokyo, Toronto: Schott Musik International. .

External links
Amour, details, Ed Chang

20th-century classical music
Compositions by Karlheinz Stockhausen
Solo clarinet pieces
Solo flute pieces
1976 compositions
Serial compositions